Glaphyria argentipunctalis is a moth in the family Crambidae. It was described by Hans Georg Amsel in 1956. It is found in Venezuela.

References

Moths described in 1956
Glaphyriini